eFlow is the tolling brand name of the M50 motorway tolling operation managed by Irish company Turas Mobility Services (a subsidiary of a French global organization called VINCI Concessions) on behalf of Transport Infrastructure Ireland. The tolling station is located on the M50 on the north side of the West-Link bridge.

Like other eToll systems, eFlow allows cashless payment on all of Ireland's toll roads. eFlow uses overhead cameras on the M50 and detectors to read electronic tags or number plates on vehicles.

In 2007 the National Roads Authority awarded the contract to construct and operate the new tolling system for the M50 to Sanef ITS Operations Ireland, a French consortium of toll operator SANEF and tolling system designer CS. Both companies have worked on similar electronic tolling systems in Europe and North America.

eFlow tags are "interoperable", allowing motorists to use them on other eToll plazas on Ireland's road network. Electronic tags from other providers - MiniTag, Eazy Pass, eTrip, Eirtag, PassDirect and Tolltag - can also be used on the M50.

With the introduction of the electronic system, the existing barrier toll barriers began to be dismantled in September 2008, and drivers now pass through the toll point at normal driving speed. Bottlenecks at the old toll barriers often caused long tailbacks, which were often featured in the roadwatch traffic reports of AA Ireland.

Charges
M50 Toll charges as of 2020 

eFlow Tag Registered vehicles pay a monthly account fee of €1.23.

Forms of Payment
Payment is by cash, credit or debit card and is payable in stores or on the eFlow website. Toll charges must be paid by 8pm the following day of the journey or the driver incurs a penalty charge.

Exempt Vehicles
The following vehicles are exempt from eFlow toll charges.
 Motorcycles
 Vehicles modified for disabled use
 Fingal County Council vehicles
 Army vehicles
 Garda and ambulance service vehicles
 M50 Maintenance Vehicles

Controversy
Since the launch of the eTolling system at the West-Link in 2008, it has not been without controversy. In the opening weeks it was reported that up to 20,000 vehicles a day were not being recorded correctly, with some fleet and car-hire operators claiming up to 100 mis-directed fines per day. While the NRA initially stated that such issues affected only a small proportion of eToll users, Sanef ITS Operations Ireland has since acknowledged issues with incorrect toll charges for a "significant minority".

External links
eFlow
National Roads Authority

References 

Road transport in the Republic of Ireland
Electronic toll collection
Motorways in the Republic of Ireland
Roads in County Dublin